Cowdrey is an unincorporated community with a U.S. Post Office in Jackson County, Colorado, United States. The Cowdrey Post Office has the ZIP Code 80434.

Geography
Cowdrey is located at  (40.858227,-106.312637).

See also

References

External links

Unincorporated communities in Jackson County, Colorado
Unincorporated communities in Colorado